Low Taek Jho (born 4 November 1981), often called Jho Low, is a Malaysian fugitive businessman, wanted by authorities internationally in connection with the 1Malaysia Development Berhad scandal (1MDB scandal). He has been named the mastermind of the massive fraud, which prosecutors allege was a scheme to siphon US$4.5 billion from 1MDB into Low's personal accounts. He is the beneficiary of numerous discretionary trust assets said by the US government to originate from payments out of the Malaysian 1MDB fund. Low has stated that he "will not submit to any jurisdiction where guilt has been predetermined by politics and where there is no independent legal process", maintaining his innocence throughout the 1MDB scandal. He contends that Malaysian authorities are engaging in a campaign of harassment and political persecution due to his prior support of former Prime Minister Najib Razak, whose part in the 1MDB scandal had led to Najib being convicted on seven counts of abuse of power, money laundering and criminal breach of trust.

Early life 
Low was born to a wealthy Malaysian Chinese family. He is of Teochew descent and he grew up in George Town, on Penang Island. His family has traditionally maintained a low profile. His grandfather Low Meng Tak was a businessman born in Guangdong in China. Meng Tak had interests in iron-ore mining and liquor distilleries in Thailand in the 1960s and 1970s, and in real estate in Thailand, Malaysia, and Hong Kong. Low's father Tan Sri Larry Low Hock Peng founded investment holding company MWE Holdings.

Low was the youngest of three children. He attended Chung Ling High School and The International School of Penang (Uplands) before being sent to the elite Harrow School in London. The school boasts notable alumni, including former British Prime Minister Winston Churchill and the first Prime Minister of India, Jawaharlal Nehru. He took this opportunity to rub shoulders with students from powerful families, including royals from the Middle East and Brunei. In London, he developed a "close relationship" with Riza Aziz, the stepson of former Malaysian Prime Minister Najib Razak. Low then enrolled in the undergraduate program of the University of Pennsylvania's Wharton School, where he continued to develop connections with Malaysians as well as Kuwaiti and Jordanian interests and began managing money for his friends and family. He graduated from Wharton in 2005.

Low can speak Malay, English, Cantonese, Hokkien, and Teochew.

Business dealings and wealth 
Although earlier in his career Low had often claimed to be investing and making purchases on behalf of other investors or "friends" to maintain a low profile about his family's wealth, in 2015 Low said that his family had considerable independent means. While a 2015 New York Times article suggested that his family was of "somewhat deflated affluence," a 2014 Wall Street Journal profile had called him a "scion."

Career 
Low's first major deal was the Kuwait Finance House's 2006 purchase for US$87 million of a luxury high-rise apartment building in Kuala Lumpur. According to The New York Times, "By 2007, Low had formed an investment group that included a Malaysian prince, a Kuwaiti sheikh and a friend from the United Arab Emirates who went on to become ambassador to the United States and Mexico, and is now one of the most powerful right hand persons for the Crown Prince of Abu Dhabi." By 2010, Low had consolidated his fortune into Jynwel Capital, of which Low was the principal steward.

As steward of Jynwel, Low cultivated relationships with some of the world's largest and most reputable sovereign wealth funds, including Abu Dhabi's Mubadala Development Co and the Kuwait Investment Authority. Jynwel is connected with deals including the acquisition of New York's Park Lane Hotel for US$660 million in 2013 with The Witkoff Group and Mubadala; the takeover of Coastal Energy in 2014 for US$2.2 billion; and the buyout of EMI's music publishing business in 2012 for US$2.2 billion with the Blackstone Group, Sony Corporation and Mubadala. Low was the architect for Jynwel Capital's unsuccessful US$2.2 billion bid to buy Reebok from Adidas AG in October 2014.

Low supported Aziz in the establishment of Red Granite Pictures, a Hollywood production company responsible for films including Wolf of Wall Street and Dumb and Dumber To. Recovery of the rights in both movies was the subject of actions for recovery by the US Government in 2013 and 2016. The claims were settled in August 2018, with the settlement stipulating that the payment should not be construed as "an admission of wrongdoing or liability on the part of Red Granite".

In 2019, US authorities pursuing Low described him as a financial intermediary, which allowed him to use his connections to high net worth individuals and international institutions to launder the money stolen through manipulation of the 1Malaysia Development Berhad.

1MDB  

Najib Razak became Prime Minister of Malaysia in 2009.  Soon, he became president of the board of advisers for 1Malaysia Development Berhad (1MDB), a Malaysian sovereign wealth fund. Although Low never received an official position, he admits that he occasionally "consulted" with 1MDB, and was involved in a number of transactions connecting his own interests with those of 1MDB, which he claimed were "arms-length and legally sound."

The Wall Street Journal has reported that a $33.5 million condominium in Manhattan was owned by a shell company under control of Low's family trust, and then was sold and transferred to a shell company controlled by Razak's stepson. Another home in Beverly Hills, "known as the pyramid house for a gold pyramid in its garden", was owned by a shell company controlled by the Low family trust, and was sold and transferred to Razak's stepson by transferring shares of the shell company to him.

In October 2016, Interpol published a red notice at Singapore's request to locate and arrest Low in an investigation related to 1MDB fund flows within its jurisdiction. The request for assistance to provisionally arrest Low was sent to the Hong Kong Department of Justice in April 2016, according to a representative for Singapore's police, but the request was rejected by the Hong Kong authorities.

After the Malaysian general election in 2018, new Prime Minister Mahathir Mohamad re-opened the extensive investigations into the 1MDB matter and, despite prior findings by former Malaysian Attorney General Mohamed Apandi Ali and the Malaysian Anti-Corruption Commission that no crime had been committed, issued arrest warrants against Low. The filing of these charges leading to the arrest warrant were described by a spokesperson for Low as "political reprisal" by the Mahathir regime which was described as having a disregard for the rule of law. In light of the warrants, some consider him a fugitive as he has reportedly been sought by the Malaysian authorities in connection with the 1MDB matter, notwithstanding that Low agreed to assist with the probe.

According to South China Morning Post reports, Low is still involved in affairs of his Hong Kong companies. He signed documents for private equity firm Jynwel Capital and non-profit group Jynwel Charitable Foundation in July 2018, even though Malaysian authorities were looking to arrest him in connection with the 1MDB scandal which he has stated as politically motivated. He was alleged to have been in discussions with the Malaysian government on a potential deal, but the Malaysian government and he did not come to a deal.

Low allegedly purchased a US$325,000 white Ferrari as a wedding gift for Kim Kardashian in 2011. The Department of Justice (DoJ) was reported to have sought restitution from other famous celebrities who had received gifts from Low, among them Leonardo DiCaprio, who has since returned Picasso and Basquiat paintings; and Miranda Kerr who returned diamond jewellery with a market value of US$8 million.

Low invested $100 million for production of The Wolf of Wall Street, which was subsequently nominated for the Oscars. Leonardo DiCaprio specially thanked Low for his involvement during one of the awards ceremonies. Red Granite, a productions company that was backed by Low, threw a lavish party in Cannes, France, complete with a performance by Kanye West.

In June 2017, the US Government, in proceedings brought against certain assets in the Central District of California, sought return of millions worth of assets derived from the Malaysian 1MDB wealth fund. On 1 November 2018, Low and two ex-Goldman Sachs bankers, Tim Leissner and Roger Ng Chong Hwa, were indicted by the United States Department of Justice in connection with the 1MDB allegations.

On 31 October 2019, Low entered into a global, comprehensive settlement with the US government forever resolving all civil, criminal, and administrative proceedings concerning asset forfeiture claims against various Low-linked assets.  The settlement did not resolve the government's underlying money laundering and bribery charges and is not otherwise tied to the ongoing U.S. criminal case against him.
 
In 2019, Low was accused of a connection to the Burning Sun scandal through his friendship with Korean musician Psy; Low, Psy and others denied the allegations. The case was closed for lack of evidence.

On June 11, 2021, the U. S. Department of Justice announced charges related to violation of United States federal law. "Low Taek Jho, 39, also known as Jho Low, and Prakazrel “Pras” Michel, 48, are alleged to have conspired with Elliott Broidy" related to their "... engaging in undisclosed lobbying campaigns at the direction of Low and the Vice Minister of Public Security for the People's Republic of China".

Citizenship 
Jho Low was born as Malaysian citizen upon birth, however Malaysia has a ban on  dual nationality of its citizens. Low was known to have acquired his first foreign nationality through naturalisation of investment in St. Kitts and Nevis in 2011 but upon the acquisition of his citizenship it was not known to the Malaysian authorities at that time.

Weekly publication St Kitts & Nevis Observer in its news report said Low became an economic citizen of Saint Kitts and Nevis in 2011, but had never entered the country.

Jho Low became an economic citizen of St Kitts and Nevis under the Denzil Douglas-led administration in 2011, but has never at any time entered the country. Immigration records indicate that Jho Low has never entered any port in St Kitts and Nevis.

On 8 June 2018 the Immigration Department of Malaysia had announced their intentions to deprive Jho Low of his Malaysian citizenship and the revocation of his Malaysian passport and nationality as a whole.

In July 2018, the Immigration director general stated: “We find that he is still using the same name (Low Taek Jho) on the passport,” he said, adding that it was an offence for a Malaysian citizen to carry two passports.

On 3 November 2019, newspapers reported that Low had been granted a Cypriot passport in September 2015. It was reported that Low obtained the passport under the Cypriot citizenship investment scheme "within two days after investing in some property" in Cyprus. At the time, there was no warrant against Low for the 1MDB scandal; however, he was already under investigation. The revelation concerning Low's Cypriot citizenship came after the Cypriot citizenship investment scheme came under scrutiny after it was revealed by a leak, the Cyprus Papers, that the Cypriot government, under the presidency of Nicos Anastasiades, had granted citizenship to Cambodian elites.

Career as a fugitive 
Low is believed to be residing in China where he secretly travels extensively through major cities. In November 2020, Al-Jazeera reported that Low was currently living in Macau, in "a house owned by a senior member of the Chinese Communist Party." He has managed to travel freely despite the Malaysian police submitting an Interpol red alert, saying these actions are politically motivated. The Chinese government has denied harboring Low.

Politics

Electioneering in Malaysia 
Consistent with his personal connections to the Razak family, Low supported and funded the Prime Minister with 1MDB cash during the 2013 elections. He organised a free pro-government concert in his home state of Penang featuring American musicians Busta Rhymes and Ludacris, which was criticised by the local opposition government as unfair electioneering even though Low's close friend claimed the concert was for charity.

Lobbying activities in the United States 
According to a 6 May 2019 United States Department of Justice's indictment, Low was allegedly involved in a conspiracy to gain access to, and potentially influence, Barack Obama's 2012 campaign without disclosing the foreign origins of the money funneled to Obama's Super PAC. The indictment against Low revealed that he directed the transfer of US$21.6 million from foreign entities to former Fugees rapper Pras in 2012 for funneling into the US election.

Low was also helped by former Justice Department employee Higginbotham, who pleaded guilty to a charge in November 2018, to set up bank accounts for a lobbying campaign against the US investigations into the 1MDB scandal. In response, a spokesman for Low stated that "Mr. Low has never made any campaign contribution directly or indirectly in the United States."

The FBI has considered whether a donation of $100,000 to Trump Victory in 2017 originated with Low. The Wall Street Journal reported that $75 million was offered to Elliott Broidy, a businessman and a Republican fundraiser, and his wife if the Justice Department ended its probe into 1MDB.

In June 2021, Low was charged by a federal grand jury for running a back-channel campaign to get the Trump administration to drop an investigation of Low and the 1MDB investment company.

Social life 

Low once lived a high-profile social life before becoming an international fugitive. Low's lavish lifestyle was purportedly funded by money pilfered from the 1MDB fund. His associations included Paris Hilton, Leonardo di Caprio, Kimora Lee Simmons, Jamie Foxx, Busta Rhymes, Kasseem Dean, Emily Ratajkowski and Alicia Keys.

He dated Taiwanese singer Elva Hsiao and also started a romance with Victoria's Secret model Miranda Kerr. In June 2017, Kerr surrendered $8 million in jewelry to the US government amid an inquiry into the  scandal. The jewelry had been given to her by Low in 2014, with whom she was at the time in a romantic relationship.

Philanthropy 
Low has contributed money to various charities. However, much, if not all, of his charitable giving occurred after the 1MDB scandal began to unfold, and thus critics claim that the money provided to various charities was stolen from 1MDB and that Low's charitable giving is simply part of a public relations strategy to burnish Low's tarnished image.

See also
Billion Dollar Whale - book about Jho Low
Corruption in Malaysia
List of fugitives from justice who disappeared

References 

1981 births
Fugitives
Fugitives wanted by Malaysia
Living people
Malaysian businesspeople
Malaysian people of Teochew descent
Malaysian people of Chinese descent
Malaysian philanthropists
People educated at Harrow School
People from Penang
Political scandals in Malaysia
Confidence tricksters
Webarchive template wayback links
Wharton School of the University of Pennsylvania alumni
Fraudsters
Money launderers